Star Wars Chess is a 1993 chess-playing video game developed by The Software Toolworks, based on the Star Wars film franchise and published by Mindscape for DOS, Sega CD and Windows 3.x. A 3DO Interactive Multiplayer version was planned but never released.

Reception
Computer Gaming World concluded that T2 Chess Wars and Star Wars Chess "are examples of marketing at its best (or worst, depending on your point of view)".

Mega Magazine giving Star Wars Chess a 60 percent rating stating “The chances are that if you take your chess at all seriously, you wouldn’t really enjoy this.”

In 1996, Computer Gaming World declared Star Wars Chess the 49th-worst computer game ever released stating: “Proof that there really is no intelligent life (or AI) even in a galaxy far, far away”.

GamePro magazine however praised the game's action scenes, sound, detailed animation and stating "Chess purists and Star Wars purists alike will enjoy this one.  Most impressive!"

References

External links
 

1993 video games
Cancelled 3DO Interactive Multiplayer games
Chess software
DOS games
Mindscape games
Sega CD games
Star Wars video games
The Software Toolworks games
Video games developed in the United States
Windows games